Jone Morino (28 April 1896 – ?) was an Italian film actress. Born in Rome, Italy, appeared in at least 37 films between 1938 and 1956.

Filmography

The House of Shame (1938)
Validita Giorni 10 (1940) - Signora Torquada
Manovre d'amore  (1941) - Matilde
Turbine (1941) - Giovanna
 Piccolo mondo antico (1941) - Donna Eugenia
Solitudine (1941) - Contessa Carli
Margherita fra i tre' (1942) - Renata
 C'e sempre un ma! (1942) - Isabella
 Invisible Chains (1942) - La madre di Enrico
 Signorinette (1942)
Soltanto un bacio (1942) - La Contessa Matilde
 Finalmente soli (1942) - Signora Mariani
 Se io fossi onesto (1942) - Magda Englesh
 L'Ultino addio (1942) - Madre Di Irene
 Le bie del cuore (1942) - L'Amica Pettegola
 L'Amico delle donne (1942) - Ortensia Leverdet
 Avanti c'è posto / Before the Postman (1942) - Signora svampita
 Senza una donna (1943) - Donna Gloria
 Il fidanzato di mia moglie (1943)  - Matilde Sarti
 Non sono superstizioso... ma! (1943)  - La madre di Rosetta
 La sua strada (1943) 
  Inquietudine (1946) 
 Il delitto di Giovanni Episcopo (1947)
 I pirati di Capri (1948)
 Duello senza onore (1949)
 Lo sparviero del Nilo / Hawk of the Nile (1949) - Madame Corinne
 Taxi di notte / Night Taxi (1950)
 Canzone di primavera / Song of Spring (1950) - Fanny
 Domenica d'agosto (1950)
 Stasera Sciopero (1951)
 Altri tempi (1951) - Zia Maddalena ("L'idillio")
 Romanzano d'amore (1951) - Signora Contini
 Il segreto delle tre punte (1952)
 A fil di spada (1952)
 It Was She Who Wanted It! (1953) - Donna Eva
 Questa è la vita (1954) - La moglie dell'amministratore ("Marsina stretta")
 Sette canzoni per sette sorelle'' (1956)

References

External links

1896 births
1978 deaths
Italian film actresses
Italian silent film actresses
Actresses from Rome
20th-century Italian actresses